The 2011–12 WHL season is the 46th season of the Western Hockey League (WHL). The regular season began in September 2011 and ended in March 2012. The following playoffs began on March 22 and ended in early May when the Edmonton Oil Kings won their first championship. This was the inaugural season of the Victoria Royals, a team that relocated to Victoria from Chilliwack where they played as the Chilliwack Bruins between 2006 and 2011.

Regular season 
The 46th season of the WHL started on September 22, 2011 and ended on March 18, 2012.

Standings

Conference standings 

x – team has clinched playoff spot

y – team is division leader

z – team has clinched division

e - team is eliminated from playoff contention

Statistical leaders

Scoring leaders 
Players are listed by points, then goals.

Note: GP = Games played; G = Goals; A = Assists; Pts. = Points; PIM = Penalty minutes

Goaltenders 
These are the goaltenders that lead the league in GAA that have played at least 1440 minutes.

Note: GP = Games played; Mins = Minutes played; W = Wins; L = Losses; OTL = Overtime losses; SOL = Shootout losses; SO = Shutouts; GAA = Goals against average; Sv% = Save percentage 

1 - Also played for Everett Silvertips

Players

2011 NHL Entry Draft 
In total, 33 WHL players were selected at the 2011 NHL Entry Draft. Ryan Nugent-Hopkins was selected first overall in the draft.

Transactions
2011-12 WHL transactions

Subway Super Series 
The Subway Super Series is a six-game series featuring four teams: three from the Canadian Hockey League (CHL) versus Russia's National Junior hockey team. Within the Canadian Hockey League umbrella, one team from each of its three leagues — the Ontario Hockey League, Quebec Major Junior Hockey League, and Western Hockey League — compete in two games against the Russian junior team.

Results

2012 WHL Playoffs

Conference Quarter-finals

Eastern Conference

(1) Edmonton Oil Kings vs. (8) Kootenay Ice

(2) Moose Jaw Warriors vs. (7) Regina Pats

(3) Calgary Hitmen vs. (6) Brandon Wheat Kings

(4) Medicine Hat Tigers vs. (5) Saskatoon Blades

Western Conference

(1) Tri-City Americans vs. (8) Everett Silvertips

(2) Kamloops Blazers vs. (7) Victoria Royals

(3) Portland Winterhawks vs. (6) Kelowna Rockets

(4) Vancouver Giants vs. (5) Spokane Chiefs

Conference Semi-finals

Eastern Conference

(1) Edmonton Oil Kings vs. (6) Brandon Wheat Kings

(2) Moose Jaw Warriors vs. (4) Medicine Hat Tigers

Western Conference

(1) Tri-City Americans vs. (5) Spokane Chiefs

(2) Kamloops Blazers vs. (3) Portland Winterhawks
 

^ Game was played at Rose Garden.

Conference Finals

Eastern Conference

(1) Edmonton Oil Kings vs. (2) Moose Jaw Warriors

Western Conference

(1) Tri-City Americans vs. (3) Portland Winterhawks

WHL Championship

(E1) Edmonton Oil Kings vs. (W3) Portland Winterhawks

Playoff scoring leaders
Note: GP = Games played; G = Goals; A = Assists; Pts = Points; PIM = Penalty minutes

Playoff leading goaltenders
Note: GP = Games played; Mins = Minutes played; W = Wins; L = Losses; GA = Goals Allowed; SO = Shutouts; SV& = Save percentage; GAA = Goals against average

Memorial Cup

WHL awards

All-Star Teams

Eastern Conference

Western Conference

See also 
 2012 Memorial Cup
 List of WHL seasons
 2011–12 OHL season
 2011–12 QMJHL season
 2011 in ice hockey
 2012 in ice hockey

References

External links 

 Official website of the Western Hockey League
 Official website of the Canadian Hockey League
 Official website of the MasterCard Memorial Cup
 Official website of the Subway Super Series

Western Hockey League seasons
Whl
WHL